Wendell Morgan (born 22 April 1935) is a retired Welsh professional footballer who played as a wing half and outside left in the Football League for Brentford, Carlisle United and Gillingham. Though Morgan did not make a first team appearance while with Cardiff City early in his career, his later spells with Swansea Town and Newport County made him one of a small group of players who have been contracted to all three South Wales Football League clubs.

Club career

Early years 
Morgan began his career with local Gorseinon non-League club Grovesend Welfare, before moving to First Division club Cardiff City in May 1952. He failed to make an appearance for the first team before departing in June 1954.

Brentford 
Morgan signed for newly relegated Third Division South club Brentford in June 1954, after writing a letter to manager Bill Dodgin to request a trial. He spent the 1954–55 season in the reserve team and finally made the first senior appearance of his career in a 3–0 victory over Crystal Palace on 15 October 1955. He made 16 further appearances during the 1955–56 season and scored five goals. After making five early-1957–58 season appearances, Morgan left the Bees. He made 49 appearances and scored six goals during just under two years as a first team player at Griffin Park.

Gillingham 
Morgan signed for Third Division South strugglers Gillingham on a free transfer in September 1957. He immediately established himself in the team, making 38 appearances and scoring four goals, but he could not help the Gills suffering relegation to the Fourth Division at the end of the 1957–58 season. He departed Priestfield in July 1958.

Swansea Town 
Morgan returned home to West Glamorgan to sign for Second Division club Swansea Town for a £5,000 fee in July 1958. He was kept out of the team by fellow outside left Norman Lawson and made just seven appearances during the 1958–59 season. He left Vetch Field in June 1959.

Newport County 
Morgan moved across South Wales to join Third Division club Newport County in June 1959. He made 26 league appearances and scored three goals during the 1959–60 season, but the club finished in mid-table mediocrity. He left the club in July 1960.

Carlisle United 
Morgan moved back to England to join Fourth Division club Carlisle United in July 1960. He made 36 league appearances and scored two goals during his season with the club.

Llanelli 
Morgan ended his career with Welsh League First Division club Llanelly during the 1961–62 season.

Representative career 
As a boy, Morgan represented the Great Britain Boys Clubs team.

Managerial career 
After his retirement from football, Morgan served as manager at Welsh lower league club Garden Village.

Career statistics

References

1935 births
People from Gorseinon
Welsh footballers
Cardiff City F.C. players
English Football League players
Association football wing halves
Living people
Brentford F.C. players
Association football outside forwards
Gillingham F.C. players
Swansea City A.F.C. players
Newport County A.F.C. players
Carlisle United F.C. players
Llanelli Town A.F.C. players
Garden Village A.F.C. managers
Welsh football managers
Footballers from Swansea